Pat Page may refer to:

 Harlan Page (1887–1965), known as Pat, basketball player and sportsman
 Patrick Page (born 1962), actor and playwright
 Pat Page (magician) (1929–2010), British magician